The 1906 WAFA season was the 22nd season of senior Australian rules football in Perth, Western Australia.

Ladder

Grand Final

References

West Australian Football League seasons
WAFL